"With the Wind and the Rain in Your Hair" is a song composed by Clara Edwards, with lyrics by Jack Lawrence. First published in 1930, it became a hit a decade later.

A known recording by Kay Kyser and His Orchestra (with the vocal refrain by Ginny Simms) dates from November 28, 1939 and was issued on a Columbia 78 rpm record (cat. nr. 35350) in 1940.

Bob Crosby recorded the song with his orchestra on February 13, 1940 and released on a Decca 78 rpm (cat. nr. 3018) in March. His version spent 14 weeks on the Billboards Best Selling Retail Records chart, peaking at number 2 for 3 weeks.

Another hit version was by Bob Chester featuring Dolores O'Neill on vocals (b/w "I Walk with Music", Bluebird 10614), it peaked at number 18 in April 1940.

In late 1959, a version by Pat Boone reached number 21 on the Billboard Hot 100.

 Charts Pat Boone's version'

References 

Pat Boone songs
1940 songs
1959 singles
Songs with music by Clara Edwards (composer)
Songs written by Jack Lawrence (songwriter)
Columbia Records singles
Dot Records singles